The Houston Open was a golf tournament in Texas in the early years of the PGA Tour, played sporadically in Houston between 1922 and 1938. The last two editions were at par-71 River Oaks Country Club, played February 11–14, 1937, and December 29–31, 1938.

The area received an annual tournament in 1946, and River Oaks was the site for its first edition.

# Scheduled 54 holes
^ Played over 64 holes (holes 16 and 17 unplayable)
* Scheduled 36 holes

Notes and references

Former PGA Tour events
Golf in Houston
Sports competitions in Houston